John Kenneth Goodison (1943-1995) who first appeared as Johnny B. Great, was an English rock musician, songwriter and record producer.

Career 
He was best known as vocalist for his later project Big John's Rock and Roll Circus, which had a number 1 hit in South Africa. He also used the pseudonyms Peter Simmons and Peter Simons for co-writing songs for such as The Brotherhood of Man; Goodison was in the Brotherhood's original line-up from its foundation in 1969, co-writing and performing its 1970 chart hits "United We Stand" and "Where Are You Going to My Love" as well as other songs before leaving the group in 1971. 

In 1975 he co-wrote and co-produced The Bay City Rollers' second No. 1 "Give a Little Love" with Phil Wainman, and Status Quo had a Top 40 hit in 1988 with "Who Gets The Love", co-written by Goodison and Pip Williams.

Goodison used to back The Walker Brothers on tour.  He also worked for CBS Records and recorded "Race with the Devil" by Gun.

He appears (as Johnny B. Great) in the 1964 film "Just For You" singing "If I Had a Hammer" with his own distinctive piano accompaniment.

Death 
Goodison died in 1995.

Discography

Albums
 Big John's Rock 'n' Roll Circus (DJM, 1974) as Big John's Rock and Roll Circus
 On the Road (DJM, 1977) as Big John's Rock and Roll Circus

Singles
 "School Is In" b/w "She's a Much Better Lover Than You" (Decca, 1963) as Johnny B. Great and The Goodmen
 "Acapulco 1922" b/w "You'll Never Leave Him" (Decca, 1964) as Johnny B. Great
 "Twenty Three" b/w "I Believe in You" (Prairie Records) as Big John
 "Rockin' in the USA" b/w "Love" as Big John's Rock and Roll Circus (1974)
 "When Will You Be Mine" b/w "I'm In the Army Now" as Big John's Rock and Roll Circus (1975) 
 "Lady (Put the Light on Me)" as Big John's Rock and Roll Circus (1975)  (covered by US group Brownsville Station in 1977)
 "Summertime Blues" b/w "Wanting You" (CBS Records|Epic, 1976) as Johnny Goodison

References

External links
Songwriting credits @ AllMusic

1995 deaths
English pop singers
English songwriters
English record producers
Brotherhood of Man members
1943 births